Ram Jam is the debut studio album by American rock band Ram Jam in 1977. The first track on the album, the single "Black Betty", is Ram Jam's best known song. It went to #7 on the UK singles chart in September 1977. The album reached No. 34 on the Billboard Pop Albums chart in the United States. The band was re-christened "American Ram Jam" for the UK market to avoid confusion with a UK band bearing the same name.

In 1996, the album was reissued on CD as Golden Classics with a bonus track, "I Should Have Known", which was originally the B-side to the "Black Betty" single.

Track listing

Charts

Personnel
 Myke Scavone – vocals, percussion
 Bill Bartlett – guitar, vocals
 Howie Blauvelt – bass guitar, vocals
 Peter Charles – drums
 David Goldflies - bass guitar (track 1)
 Tom Kurtz - guitar (track 1)
 David Fleeman - drums (track 1)

Production
Jeffry Katz – producer
Jerry Kasenetz – producer
Stanisław Zagórski –  cover art

References

Ram Jam albums
1977 debut albums
Epic Records albums
Albums produced by Jeffry Katz
Albums produced by Jerry Kasenetz